Acosma is a monotypic moth genus in the family Cossidae described by Roman V. Yakovlev in 2011. It contains only one species, Acosma gurkoi, described in the same article, which is found in South Sudan.

References

Natural History Museum Lepidoptera generic names catalog

Zeuzerinae
Monotypic moth genera